Pop Culture Classroom, based in Denver, Colorado, is a nonprofit organization that educates in the areas of literacy and arts through alternative approaches to learning and character development. The organization creates educational programs for underserved youths, schools and communities by using comic books, graphic novels and related media to inspire passion for reading, art, and learning.

Overview and history
Pop Culture Classroom was founded in 2010 as Comic Book Classroom, a Colorado charitable organization focused on enhancing and improving student’s learning experience through the use of comic book media. At the same time, the founders of Comic Book Classroom also created the Denver Comic Con event, later renamed Denver Pop Culture Con. The Original Founders of Comic Book Classroom and Denver Comic Con were Charlie LaGreca, Frank Romero, David Vinson and Kevin Vinson.

Between 2010 and 2012, the Original Founders were joined by accomplished educators Illya Kowalchuk and Christina Angel, and experienced event organizers Michael Newman and Bruce Macintosh, who became an integral part of organizational development as the foundations of both Comic Book Classroom and Denver Comic Con educational programs were developed simultaneously.

The Classroom program debuted the first version of its “Storytelling Through Comics” curriculum to local area schools in Fall 2011. “Storytelling Through Comics” is a graphic literature creation program that is offered free of charge to schools, teachers and community organizations. The program currently offers students an educational experience that includes instruction in reading & vocabulary, writing stories, and eventually the creation of the students’ own comics. Completed entries are then published in a class collection.

With the help of hundreds of dedicated volunteers and generous donations, the Classroom launched the Denver Comic Con event on Father’s Day weekend, June 15, 2012.

In 2014, the Board of Directors removed both co-founders Charlie LaGreca and Frank Romero, then voted to change the name to Pop Culture Classroom (PCC). The name change reflects the board's broader vision for the organization to go beyond comic books.

In 2019, Pop Culture Classroom launched Reno Pop Culture Con in Reno, Nevada.

In 2020, Denver Pop Culture Con and Reno Pop Culture Con were canceled due to the COVID-19 pandemic.

In March 2021, Fan Expo HQ acquired Denver Pop Culture Con from Pop Culture Classroom. Pop Culture Classroom will remain a part of the event as its featured charity and by providing educational program.

Need
The need for literacy education in Colorado inspired the Classroom program. High percentages of elementary and middle school-aged children in Colorado do not have or cannot afford after-school care.  Additionally, several studies show that children who receive arts education often outperform children who do not in most educational areas.

Curriculum
Pop Culture Classroom’s “Storytelling Through Comics” curriculum is designed to educate 11- to 14-year-old students (grades 5-8) about literacy and the arts. The common core curriculum enhances students’ writing and reading abilities and artistic skills through an interactive educational experience focused around comic books and graphic novels. It can be offered as an after-school course, a stand-alone unit, or as a complement to an existing language arts curriculum in a classroom.

The six-week program is broken out into a series of distinct lesson modules:

•	The Joy of Reading: Students learn the terms associated with the creation, design and reading of comics and gain an understanding of the enjoyment and personal fulfillment associated with the medium.
•	Visual & Textual Storytelling: Students learn about storytelling arcs and define exposition, event, rising action, crisis, falling action and conclusion. Participants begin drafting their own short comic strip using the storytelling arc as a template.
•	Dialogue: Students are introduced to dialogue as a narrative device and begin scripting their stories.
•	Analyzing Conflict Resolution through Dialogue and Using an Outline: Students learn how dialogue reveals conflict and resolution in comics and learn the technique of reverse outlining to pace their stories.
•	Basic Drawing for Comics: Students learn basic drawing techniques from a guest artist.
•	Creating Comics and the “Author’s Chair” Celebration: Students finish their comic story using techniques taught in previous modules and celebrate their achievement.

Programming
Programming is conducted by volunteers, many of whom are trained arts educator or comic industry professionals. In addition to actively teaching in classrooms and after-school programs, volunteers provide administrative support, curriculum/assessment development, comic and literature reviews, outreach, website development, fundraising and event planning.

Pop Culture Classroom’s programming includes:

In-schools programs
Trained volunteers facilitate the program in local schools as an after-school program, a stand-alone unit or as a complement to existing language arts classes or programs.

Event programs
Pop Culture Classroom provides high-quality educational experiences at Fan Expo Denver with the Kids’ Lab, Gaming & Teen Lounge, and other programs.

Influence
Since the first Pop Culture Classroom program was conducted at Force Elementary School (Denver Public Schools) in the spring of 2010, Pop Culture Classroom has impacted over 400 students in the Denver metro region. The organization has conducted programs at over a dozen elementary and middle schools in the Denver area as well as community organizations such as the Boys & Girls Club of Metro Denver and the WOW! Children's Museum of Lafayette, Colorado.

Support
Supplementary support for Pop Culture Classroom’s educational programming is provided by the Stan Lee Foundation and the national non-for-profit organization Generation Schools. In 2013, actor William Shatner appeared in the Pop Culture Classroom's "Corral" at Denver Comic Con to read Maurice Sendak's children's book Where The Wild Things Are in support of Pop Culture Classroom.

References

Creative writing programs
Alternative education
Mass media in Colorado